Against the Stars is the sixth studio album by Boston-based indie rock band the Dambuilders, and their third for a major label. It was released on July 29, 1997 on East West and Elektra Records.

Background and recording
Against the Stars was recorded in the basement of the Dambuilders' drummer, Kevin March, and produced by the band's guitarist, Eric Masunaga.

Release and promotion
Against the Stars was released on July 29, 1997 on both East West and Elektra Records. The album's first single was "Burn this Bridge". The song "Break Up With Your Boyfriend" was released as another single from the album on October 27, 1997. To promote it, the band collected fans' stories of their worst breakups via their website.

Critical reception

JT Griffith of AllMusic gave Against the Stars 3 out of 5 stars. He compared it to the Dambuilders' previous albums, writing, "If Encendedor and Ruby Red were more akin to Sub Pop records, then Against the Stars is closer to Cheap Trick arena rock." Jim Sullivan of the Boston Globe was highly favorable in his assessment of the album, writing, "The 13 tracks show a mix of pop-craft smarts and art-rock leanings. There's variety and wit, bracing guitar and violin parts, and a keen sense of melody that is consistent throughout." Writing in the Hartford Courant, Roberto Gonzalez praised both the album and the band as a whole: "Intelligent, well-crafted and intense, Boston's Dambuilders create a swirling sound of violin and electric guitar, wrapped around a tight rhythm section. While their last album, "Ruby Red," was all prickly pop, their new effort displays their true influences." Mark Lepage of the Montreal Gazette was less favorable in his review. He gave the album a rating of 5 out of 10, quipping, "Decades of technological progress, and we get a new Missing Persons with Howard Jones fronting."

Track listing

References

1997 albums
Elektra Records albums
East West Records albums